Eynali is a mountain range in north of Tabriz, Iran. The range has a couple of peaks including Eynali (1800 m), Halileh (1850 m), Pakeh-chin (1945 m), Bahlul (1985 m) and the highest one Dand (2378 m). It has red soil and Eynali peak and Dand are visible from almost everywhere in Tabriz. There is a tomb at top of the mountain which is believed to be the grave of two clerics which the mountain's name is related to them. There is a belief among people that originally the building was a Zoroasterian temple or a Church that the shrine name to is a cover to saving the structure from destruction during Muslims invasion.

A paved road connects the base in Northern highway of Tabriz to the Eynali peak. The paved road is only open for pedestrians. Nowadays the Eynali peak is a daily hiking destination for many residents of Tabriz. In early 2000s like many of other mountains in vicinity of big Iranian cities couple of unknown Iranian victims of Iran-Iraq war's are buried in top of the mountain behind the shrine as memories of the war. The mountain is also used by telecommunication companies and TV stations to rely their waves. Behind this the city council of Tabriz is trying to make an artificial forest at the hillsides of Eynali as northern green belt of Tabriz.

Photo gallery

See also
 On ibn Ali's shrine
 Eynali Cable

References

Mountains of East Azarbaijan Province
Tabriz
Tourist attractions in East Azerbaijan Province
Landforms of East Azerbaijan Province
Mountains of Iran